This is the complete list of women's Olympic medalists in athletics.

Women’s events

100 metres

200 metres

400 metres

800 metres

1500 metres

5000 metres

10,000 metres

Marathon

100 metres hurdles

400 metres hurdles

3000 metres steeplechase

4 × 100 metres relay

4 × 400 metres relay

20 kilometres race walk

High jump

Pole vault

Long jump

Triple jump

Shot put

Discus throw

Hammer throw

Javelin throw

Heptathlon

Mixed Events

4 × 400 metres relay

Discontinued events

3000 metres 
The 3000 metres run was replaced by the 5000 metres run in 1996 and henceforth.

80 metres hurdles
The 80 metres hurdles was replaced by the 100 metres hurdles in 1972.

10 kilometers race walk
In the year 2000 and henceforth, the distance was doubled to 20 kilometers.

Pentathlon
In 1984 and thenceforth, the pentathlon (five events over two days) was replaced by the heptathlon (seven events over two days), so "discontinued" is not precisely correct. The heptathlon consists of the 200 meter and 800 meter runs, the 100 meter hurdles, the shot put, the javelin throw, the high jump, and the long jump in track and field: three track events and four field events.

Conversions of distances

See also

References

International Olympic Committee results database

External links
In Praise of Track & Field's Women – slideshow by Life magazine

Athletics (women)
Medalists, women
Athletics
Olympic women

Lists of female athletes